Dairy Farmers of America Inc. (DFA) is a national milk marketing cooperative in the United States. DFA markets members' raw milk and sells milk and derivative products (dairy products, food components, ingredients and shelf-stable dairy products) to wholesale buyers both domestically and abroad.  Net sales in 2016 were $13.5 billion, representing about 22 percent of raw milk production in the United States.

History
DFA was formed in 1998 through the merger of four dairy cooperatives: the Southern region of Associated Milk Producers Inc.; Mid-America Dairymen Inc.; Milk Marketing Inc.; and Western Dairymen Cooperative Inc. Since then, five other cooperatives have become a part of DFA – Independent Cooperative Milk Producers Association, Valley of Virginia Milk Producers Association, California Cooperative Creamery, Black Hills Milk Producers and Dairylea Cooperative Inc. Its headquarters from 1998 until 2017 was near Kansas City International Airport in Kansas City, Missouri.

In 2011, DFA acquired Kemps of St. Paul, Minnesota, and its subsidiaries from HP Hood. In 2014, DFA acquired Oakhurst, and Dairylea Cooperative Inc. merged with the farmer-owned Cooperative. DFA became the sole owner of DairiConcepts in 2015, which was once a partnership between DFA and Fonterra Co-operative Group Unlimited. DFA also acquired Cumberland Dairy, a processor of ultra-pasteurized dairy products, in 2017.

In February 2020, DFA agreed to buy a “substantial” part of Dean Foods, the largest U.S. milk producer, for $433 million. As part of the deal, DFA would acquire 44 of Dean's plants. In May 2020 that deal was finalized and the acquisition was completed.

Brands

 Arla (under licensed)
 Fromageries Bel (under licensed)
 Breakstone's Butter 
 Cache Valley Creamery
 California Gold Dairy Products
 Cass Clay
 Craigs Station Creamery
 Dairy Maid Dairy
 Falfurrias
 Guida's Dairy
 Hotel Bar
 Keller's Creamery
 Kemps
 La Vaquita
 Live Real Farms
 Oakhurst
 Plugrá
 Sport Shake

Notes

Commodity price manipulation issues
In 2008, the Dairy Farmers of America and two former executives agreed to pay $12 million to settle Commodity Futures Trading Commission charges for attempting to manipulate the Class III milk futures contract and exceeding speculative position limits in that contract.

See also
 List of dairy product companies in the United States

References

External links
 

American companies established in 1998
Food and drink companies established in 1998
1998 establishments in Missouri
Agricultural cooperatives in the United States
Agricultural marketing cooperatives
Companies based in Kansas City, Missouri
Dairy products companies of the United States
Borden (company)